Family Joules is the fourteenth studio album by Foghat, released in 2003. It is the first album by the band without its founding member, guitarist and singer Dave Peverett and their first album to feature singer/guitarist Charlie Huhn and guitarist Bryan Bassett.

Track listing
All tracks written by Bryan Bassett, Roger Earl, Charlie Huhn and Tony Stevens, except where noted.

 "Mumbo Jumbo" - 4:19
 "Hero to Zero" (Duke Ellington, Bassett, Earl, Huhn, Stevens) - 4:48
 "Thames Delta Blues" - 5:38
 "Flat Busted (And Out of Gas)" (Huhn) - 4:08
 "I Feel Fine" (Bassett) - 3:11
 "I'm a Rock 'N Roller" - 5:35
 "Hit the Ground Running" - 4:05
 "Looking for You" - 4:42
 "Long Time Coming" - 3:37
 "Sex with the Ex" - 4:16
 "Self-Medicated" - 7:31
 "Mean Voodoo Woman" - 4:12
 "Voodoo Woman Blues" - 1:23
Live bonus tracks on 2010 reissue
14. "I Feel Fine" (Bassett)
15. "Mumbo Jumbo"
16. "Sweet Home Chicago" (Robert Johnson)

Personnel

Foghat
Charlie Huhn - lead vocals, guitar
Bryan Bassett - guitar, vocals
Tony Stevens - bass, vocals
Roger Earl - drums

Production
Foghat - producer
Carl Davino - assistant engineer
Linda Arcello - design, layout Design, photography
Bob Katz - mastering
Billy Kemp - photography

References

2003 albums
Foghat albums